Leobschützer Kreisblatt (lit.: Leobschütz District Paper) was a weekly local newspaper based in the Leobschütz District in the south-west of the Oppeln Region.

The Leobschützer Kreisblatt was printed by W. Wittkes Buchdruckerei  and co-published by the Der Landrat. Red.. Printing commenced in 1843.

In 1920 the Leobschützer Kreisblatt underwent crucial changes, such as simplification of its logo and the transition from an exclusively German newspaper over to a split-page bilingual German-Polish newspaper, perhaps in relation to the Upper Silesian Plebiscite. 
This new format was upheld until the magazine's discontinuation in 1922.

References 

German-language newspapers
Polish-language newspapers
Bilingual newspapers
Newspapers published in Germany
Defunct newspapers published in Germany
Głubczyce County